Ahmet Brković (born 23 September 1974) is a Croatian former footballer. His position was midfielder.

Club career
Brković started off his career in 1992 for HNK Dubrovnik in Croatia. In 1998 he transferred to NK Varteks. When he was made available for transfer after military service, clubs from the Football League expressed an interest in taking him on trial. Lennie Lawrence, then manager of Luton invited him in for a trial. Although performing well, Smiler decided that Brković was not quite ready for the English game and allowed him to move on. Leyton Orient immediately signed him up. Brković stayed at Orient for the next two seasons, scoring eight goals from midfield.

In 2001, then Luton manager Joe Kinnear signed him on a free transfer after his contract with Leyton Orient expired. Under Kinnear, Brković played in a variety of positions across the midfield, despite favouring the right-hand side. His first goal came in a 1–0 away win at Torquay United and he scored his only Luton hat-trick in the Windscreens Shield against close neighbours Stevenage Borough. Brković helped them to promotion in 2004-05, the season in which he scored 15 goals from midfield. In his first season at the Championship level, he scored eight goals in 42 league games. During the 2006-07 season, he signed a new one-year deal with Luton.

On 25 October 2007, Brković joined Millwall on loan before signing for the club permanently on 10 January 2008.

On 27 May 2009 it was announced that Brković had been released by Millwall.

During summer of 2009 he joined Croatian 4th division club Dubrovnik 1919.

Career statistics

Honours

Luton Town
League One (1): 2004-05

Individual
Goal of the Season - 2004-05
Young Members' Player of the Season - 2004-05
PFA Team of the Year - 2004-05

References

External links

1974 births
Living people
Sportspeople from Dubrovnik
Bosniaks of Croatia
Association football midfielders
Croatian footballers
NK GOŠK Dubrovnik players
NK Varaždin players
Leyton Orient F.C. players
Luton Town F.C. players
Millwall F.C. players
Croatian Football League players
First Football League (Croatia) players
English Football League players
Croatian expatriate footballers
Expatriate footballers in England
Croatian expatriate sportspeople in England